Minaret Summit is a mountain pass on Highway 203 in the central Sierra Nevada. The pass, lying on the Madera-Mono County border, is within the Mammoth Ranger District of the Inyo National Forest and located near Devils Postpile National Monument, Mammoth Lakes, and Mammoth Mountain. Highway 203 ends at Minaret Summit. The road continues, now called Reds Meadow Road, until its dead end at the Reds Meadow Pack Station near the Rainbow Falls trailhead.

Plans for a highway connecting the Eastern Sierra and the San Joaquin Valley via Minaret Summit had been discussed since the early days of highway building. An area southwest of Minaret Summit was not included in the Wilderness Act of 1964 in order to leave a corridor for this potential highway. While Governor of California, Ronald Reagan made a horse packing trip into the area. Afterwards he supported conservationists' efforts to prevent this highway. Reagan continued his efforts after being elected President in 1980 and the area was eventually designated wilderness by the California Wilderness Act of 1984.

The Summit offers views of the Ritter Range, including The Minarets, Mount Ritter and Banner Peak, to the west and the Long Valley Caldera, the Glass Mountains and the White Mountains to the east.  The Middle Fork of the San Joaquin River runs through the valley between the Summit and the Minarets.

The pass receives significant snowfall during the winter.  The road usually closes near the Main Lodge of Mammoth Mountain Ski Area before Thanksgiving and usually doesn't open much before Memorial Day.

In October 2008 items belonging to missing adventurer Steve Fossett were found by Preston Morrow on a hike near Minaret Lake, which is in an area visible from Minaret Summit.  This led to the discovery of his remains and aircraft.

References

Mountain passes of the Sierra Nevada (United States)
Inyo National Forest
Landforms of Madera County, California
Landforms of Mono County, California